From Monday to Sunday is the fourth solo album by English singer-songwriter Nick Heyward. It was released in 1993 through Epic Records and produced two singles, ‘’Kite’’ (#44 in the UK Singles Chart, No. 4 in Billboard’s Hot Modern Rock Tracks chart) and ‘’He Doesn't Love You Like I Do’’ (#58 in the UK Singles Chart).

Recording and production
The album was produced by Heyward and recorded at Shaw Sound studio in Fulham and Hans Zimmer and Stanley Myers’ Lillie Yard Studio.

Track listing

Personnel 
Credits are adapted from the album's liner notes.

 Nick Heyward – vocals, acoustic guitar
 Blair Booth – backing vocals
 Anthony Clark – keyboards, Hammond organ, backing vocals
 Geoff Dugmore – percussion
 Andy Duncan – percussion
 Richard Edwards – trombone
 Julian Gordon-Hastings – drum programming
 Les Nemes – bass guitar, guitar, drum programming
 Bob Sargeant – backing vocals
 Frank Schaefer – cello
 Neil Scott – guitar
 Ian Shaw – drum programming
 Steve Sidwell – trumpet
 Trevor Smith – drums
 Julian Stringle – clarinet
 Phil Taylor – organ, piano
 Ali Thompson – drum programming
 Graham Ward – drums
 Jimmy Williams – backing vocals, mandolin, slide guitar

Production
 Nick Heyward – record producer
 Julian Gordon-Hastings – engineer, recording
 Ian Shaw – tecording
 Denis Blackham – mastering
 Dave Bascombe – mixing

References

External links 
 
 

1993 albums
Nick Heyward albums
Epic Records albums